Oxygen scavengers or oxygen absorbers are added to enclosed packaging to help remove or decrease the level of oxygen in the package.  They are used to help maintain product safety and extend shelf life.
There are many types of oxygen absorbers available to cover a wide array of applications.

The components of an oxygen absorber vary according to intended use, the water activity of the product being preserved, and other factors. Often the oxygen absorber or scavenger is enclosed in a porous sachet or packet but it can also be part of packaging films and structures.  Others are part of a polymer structure.

Mechanism
The first patent for an oxygen scavenger used an alkaline solution of pyrogallic acid in an air-tight vessel.

Modern scavenger sachets use a mixture of iron powder and sodium chloride. Often activated carbon is also included as it adsorbs some other gases and many organic molecules, further preserving products and removing odors.

When an oxygen absorber is removed from its protective packaging, the moisture in the surrounding atmosphere begins to permeate into the iron particles inside of the absorber sachet. Moisture activates the iron, and it oxidizes to form iron oxide. Typically, there must be at least 65% relative humidity in the surrounding atmosphere before the rusting process can begin. To assist in the process of oxidation, sodium chloride is added to the mixture, acting as a catalyst or activator, causing the iron powder to be able to oxidize even with relatively low humidity. As oxygen is consumed to form iron oxide the level of oxygen in the surrounding atmosphere is reduced. Absorber technology of this type may reduce the oxygen level in the surrounding atmosphere to below 0.01%. Complete oxidation of 1 g of iron can remove 300 cm3 of oxygen in standard conditions. Though other technologies can remove more, iron is the most useful as it does not cause odor like sulfur compounds or passivate like aluminium compounds. Many other alternatives are not food safe. The moisture requirement of iron-based scavengers makes them ineffective in moisture sensitive applications.

The performance of oxygen scavengers is affected by ambient temperature and relative humidity.
Newer packaging technologies may use oxygen scavenging polymers to prevent accidental ingestion of oxygen scavengers.

Non-ferrous oxygen scavengers

While most standard oxygen scavengers contain ferrous carbonate and a metal halide catalyst, there are several non-ferrous variants, such as ascorbate with sodium hydrogen carbonate, among others available.

Typical reasons to use a non-ferrous variant would include the packaging of products intended for international shipping where metal detection would pose a problem; a desire to reduce the odor associated with ferrous carbonate; or dietary products where contact with iron should be avoided.

Ascorbic acid is often used to scavenge oxygen for generation of anaerobic environments for microbiology.

Benefits of oxygen scavengers
 Helps retain fresh-roasted flavor of coffee and nuts
 Prevents oxidation of spice oleoresins present in spices themselves and in seasoned foods
 Prevents oxidation of vitamins A, C and E
 Extends life of pharmaceuticals
 Inhibits mold in natural cheeses and other fermented dairy products
 Delays non-enzymatic browning of fruits and some vegetables
 Inhibits oxidation and condensation of red pigment of most berries and sauces
 Oxygen deprivation contributes to a pest-free environment in museums

Oxygen scavenging technology can quickly reduce oxygen levels in sealed containers to below 0.01%.

Typical uses

 Pharmaceuticals and vitamins
 Medical diagnostic kits and devices
 Potassium Metabisulfite is often used in the wine industry to both scavenge oxygen and provide a layer of gas that separates wine from oxygen.
 Foods prone to rancidification, including:
 Nuts and snacks
 Whole fat dry foods
 Processed, smoked and cured meats (including jerky and dried meat nuggets)
 Cheeses and dairy products
 Spices and seasonings
 Flour and grain items

 Other foods, including
 Fresh and precooked pasta and noodles
 Birdseed and pet food
 Breads, cookies, cakes, pastries
 Candies and confectioneries
 Coffee and tea
 Dried fruits and vegetables
 Artwork preservation
 Preserving solderability of electronic parts

Sachets

Plastic sachets offer greater protection than paper as they are not prone to disintegrating in products with high fat contents.

See also
 Active packaging
 Desiccant
 Oxygen transmission rate
 Scavenger (chemistry)

References

Packaging
Food additives
Food preservation
Oxygen